Love & Letter, also known as First Love & Letter, is the debut studio album by South Korean boy group Seventeen. It was released on April 25, 2016 through Pledis Entertainment. The album is a follow-up to the group's first two EPs, 17 Carat and Boys Be (2015).

Background and release
The album includes 10 tracks and focuses on themes such as the experience of a first love. "Pretty U" was chosen to be the title track of the album and was performed on multiple music shows by the group throughout the following two and a half months. During this time period, the group earned their first two consecutive wins on Show Champion. Their first win was on May 4, 2016, followed by a second win on May 11, 2016. Some tracks on the album are special versions of songs previously released by the group, but sung by the three teams that make up the group respectively.

Band members largely created the album, writing or co-writing every track, and composing or co-composing almost every track. The album charted at number three on Billboard's World Albums chart and at number five on the Heatseekers Albums chart. The album's promotional single "Pretty U" charted at number three on Billboard's World Digital Songs chart, which marked their highest ranking on the chart to date.

On June 24, 2016, they performed at KCON, New York and Billboard K-Town's writer Monique Menendez said, "Seventeen bring the sugar with its latest single, "Pretty U," a bright love song with choreography reminiscent of West Side Story."

Reissue

On July 4, 2016, a repackaged edition of Love & Letter, titled Love & Letter Repackage Album, was released with five new tracks, including the title track "Very Nice". The accompanying music video for the song was released on Naver V App on the same day, and received over a million 'hearts'.

Track listing

References

2016 albums
Korean-language albums
Kakao M albums
Seventeen (South Korean band) albums
Hybe Corporation albums